Diamond Jack and the Queen of Pain is the tenth solo album by Kevin Ayers, a founding member of Soft Machine.

Track listing
All tracks composed by Kevin Ayers; except where indicated

 "Madame Butterfly" – 4:30
 "Lay Lady Lay" (Bob Dylan) – 4:19
 "Who’s Still Crazy" – 4:46
 "You Keep Me Hangin' on" (J.J. Cale) – 3:26
 "You Are a Big Girl" – 3:31
 "Steppin' Out" (Ayers, Ollie Halsall) – 5:15
 "My Speeding Heart" – 4:19
 "Howling Man" – 3:28
 "Give a Little Bit" – 3:51
 "Champagne and Valium" – 3:05

Personnel

Musicians
 Kevin Ayers – guitar, vocals
 Ollie Halsall – guitar, backing vocals
 Carlos Garcia Vaso – guitars & keyboards
 Joaquin Montoya – keyboards
 Manolo Aguilar  – bass
 Javier de Juan – drums, percussion
 Zanna Gregmar – backing vocals
 Jimmy Kashisian – horn arrangements

Technical
 Julian Ruiz – producer
 Luis F. Soria – engineer
 Yeldham Muchmore – design

References

Original LP sleevenotes

1983 albums
Kevin Ayers albums
Charly Records albums